Siddu Nyamagouda (1950-2018) who was also known as Barrage Siddu was an Indian politician who was a former Minister of State for Coal in the Government of India. He also served as MLC and was elected twice as MLA to the Karnataka Legislative Assembly in 2013, 2018 from Jamakhandi constituency in Bagalkote district.

Early life
He was born on 5 August 1950 in Jamakhandi of Bagalkot district, Karnataka. He completed his schooling from P. B. High School in Jamakhandi and later completed his Bachelor of Science from Karnatak University in Dharwad.

Political career
He contested Lok Sabha election in 1991 from Bagalkot against the former Chief Minister Ramakrishna Hegde whom he defeated by a considerable margin and ultimately became Minister of State for Coal in the P. V. Narasimha Rao's cabinet. After that, he became MLC and was elected MLA of Jamkhandi in 2013 Assembly elections and got re-elected in the recent state assembly election.

Social and economic upliftment of farmers; mobilised farmers to construct rupee one crore barrage across river Krishna without Govt. aid which provided irrigation lo 30,000 acres of land and drinking water to 2.5 lakh people and employment opportunities to 1.5 lakh people; this project is the first private dam in the country constructed by the people themselves.

Notable work
He is known for building India's first private dam in 1989. The dam is named as Shrama Bindu Sagar and is built across Krishna River at Chikkapadasalagi village in Jamakhandi. The construction of dam took off in 1983 and the project drew the attention of international media. When the former chief minister of Karnataka Ramakrishna Hegde led government refused to fund the project owing to political reasons even though farmers would pay for a quarter of the expenses, he mobilized the farmers to build the barrage on their own. The Dam provided irrigation lo 30,000 acres of land and drinking water to 2.5 lakh people and employment opportunities to 1.5 lakh people. Farmers pooled their money and worked for six months to build the barrage. This accomplishment catapulted Siddu to national politics. He contested Lok Sabha election in 1991 against Ramakrishna Hegde and defeated him by considerable margin which paved the way for him to become minister in the P. V. Narasimha Rao's cabinet.

Death
He died on 28 May 2018 near Tulasigeri on the way back to his constituency from New Delhi when his car's tire exploded, causing him to lose control and hit a barrier. He had a wife, two sons and three daughters.

References

1950 births
2018 deaths
Karnataka MLAs 2018–2023
People from Bagalkot district
Karnataka MLAs 2013–2018
India MPs 1991–1996